XHCHL-FM is a radio station on 90.1 FM serving Monterrey, Nuevo León, Mexico.

History
XHCHL received its concession on November 23, 1994. XHCHL was authorized to broadcast with 15,000 (later 20,000) watts on 99.1 MHz from China, Nuevo León. On July 15, 1996, the station came to air with a grupera format known as "La Picosa". In 2007, XHCHL moved to 106.5 MHz.

In 2010, XHCHL was authorized to move to Los Ramones and broadcast on 90.1. Initially, XHCHL on 90.1 was Beat 90.1, a dance Top 40 station featuring s a current-based mix of dance music, with Top 40 and R&B remixes, along with electronica and house music. It was the second Dance Contemporary radio station in Mexico, after semi-sister station XHSON-FM/Mexico City.

In 2017 and 2018, the Bichara family, which owns Núcleo Radio Monterrey, slowly shifted XHCHL toward a new direction, which was completed in early 2018 when the station adopted the name "90.1 FM" and the slogan "Sonamos Diferente"; the Ultra name was added in August. The format is similar to that of KJAV-FM in McAllen, Texas, owned by members of the Bichara family.

On May 1, 2020, Ultra 90.1 ceased broadcasting, making way for El Heraldo Radio's Monterrey debut. The station mostly simulcast the network with some local programming for the Monterrey area. The news/talk programming moved to XHSP-FM 99.7 upon the newspaper's outright purchase of that station from Grupo Radio Centro; on June 1, 2021, Ke Buena officially launched on the frequency by way of a franchise agreement with Heraldo Media Group. The agreement ended on December 1, 2022, at which time NRM resumed programming XHCHL-FM itself and paired it with the La Ranchera de Monterrey programming of XEG-AM 1050.

References

Radio stations in Monterrey
1996 establishments in Mexico